Juliette Geverkof (born 18 August 1945) is an Iranian athlete. She competed in the women's shot put and the women's discus throw at the 1964 Summer Olympics.

References

1945 births
Living people
Athletes (track and field) at the 1964 Summer Olympics
Iranian female shot putters
Iranian female discus throwers
Olympic athletes of Iran
Place of birth missing (living people)